The biosphere reserves of Mexico are protected natural areas. Some are designated by the national government, while others are internationally designated by UNESCO.

National biosphere reserves
As of September 2021, the following areas have been designated biosphere reserves by the Mexican Government. 

 Alto Golfo de California Biosphere Reserve, Baja California
 Sian Ka'an Reefs, Quintana Roo
 Bahía de los Ángeles Biosphere Reserve, Baja California
 Baja California Pacific Islands Biosphere Reserve
 Barranca de Metztitlán Biosphere Reserve, Hidalgo
 Banco Chinchorro Biosphere Reserve, Quintana Roo
 Calakmul Biosphere Reserve, Campeche
 Chamela-Cuixmala Biosphere Reserve, Jalisco
 Deep Mexican Caribbean Biosphere Reserve
 Deep Mexican Pacific Biosphere Reserve
 El Pinacate y Gran Desierto de Altar Biosphere Reserve, Sonora
 El Triunfo Biosphere Reserve, Chiapas
 El Vizcaíno Biosphere Reserve, Baja California Sur
 Guadalupe Island Biosphere Reserve, Baja California
 Islas Marías Biosphere Reserve, Nayarit
 Janos Biosphere Reserve, Chihuahua
 La Encrucijada Biosphere Reserve, Chiapas
 La Michilía Biosphere Reserve, Durango
 La Sepultura Biosphere Reserve, Chiapas
 Lacan-Tun Biosphere Reserve, Chiapas
 Los Petenes Biosphere Reserve
 Los Tuxtlas Biosphere Reserve, Veracruz
 Mapimí Biosphere Reserve, Durango
 Marismas Nacionales Biosphere Reserve, Nayarit and Sinaloa
 Monarch Butterfly Biosphere Reserve, Michoacán and State of Mexico
 Montes Azules Biosphere Reserve, Chiapas
 Ojo de Liebre Lagoon Biosphere Reserve, Baja California Sur
 Pantanos de Centla Biosphere Reserve, Campeche and Tabasco
 Ría Celestun Biosphere Reserve, Yucatán
 Ría Lagartos Biosphere Reserve, Yucatán
 San Pedro Mártir Island Biosphere Reserve, Sonora
 Selva El Ocote Biosphere Reserve, Chiapas
 Sian Ka'an Biosphere Reserve, Quintana Roo
 Sierra del Abra Tanchipa Biosphere Reserve, San Luis Potosí
 Sierra Gorda Biosphere Reserve, Querétaro and San Luis Potosí
 Sierra Gorda de Guanajuato Biosphere Reserve, Guanajuato
 Sierra de Huautla Biosphere Reserve, Morelos and Guerrero
 Sierra La Laguna Biosphere Reserve, Baja California
 Sierra de Manantlán Biosphere Reserve, Jalisco and Colima
 Sierra de San Juan Biosphere Reserve, Nayarit
 Sierra de Tamaulipas Biosphere Reserve, Tamaulipas
 Sierra de Vallejo Biosphere Reserve, Jalisco
 Tehuacán-Cuicatlán Biosphere Reserve, Oaxaca and Puebla
 Whale Shark Biosphere Reserve (Tiburón Ballena), Quintana Roo
 Volcán Tacaná Biosphere Reserve, Chiapas
 Zicuirán-Infiernillo Biosphere Reserve, Michoacán

UNESCO biosphere reserves in Mexico

UNESCO has designated certain natural protected areas in Mexico as international biosphere reserves through its Man and the Biosphere Programme. Some are also designated biosphere reserves by the Mexican government, while others have a different national designation (national park, flora and fauna protection area, etc.).

References

 
Protected areas of Mexico
Mexico geography-related lists